Troy is a city in Lincoln County, Missouri, United States. As of 2019, the estimated population was 12,820. It is the county seat of Lincoln County. Troy is an exurb of St. Louis, and is part of the St. Louis Metropolitan Statistical Area.

History
Troy was platted in 1819. Some say the community was named after Troy, New York, while others believe the name is a transfer from Troy, Vermont.  An early variant name was Woods Fort. A post office called Troy has been in operation since 1823.

Historic sites
Fort Cap au Gris, a War of 1812 fortification, was built near Troy in 1814. Lincoln County Medical Center was established in Troy in 1953 under the Hill-Burton Memorial Hospitals Act, as Lincoln County Memorial Hospital. Cuivre River State Park, one of the largest of Missouri's state parks, lies approximately three miles to the northeast of Troy, across the Cuivre River valley.

The Downtown Troy Historic District was listed on the National Register of Historic Places in 2013.

Geography
Troy is located two miles west of the Cuivre River. U.S. 61 passes the east side of the city and Missouri Route 47 passes through the north side.

Demographics

2010 census
As of the census of 2010, there were 10,542 people, 3,843 households, and 2,727 families living in the city. The racial makeup of the city was 92.5% White, 3.1% African American, 0.4% Native American, 0.7% Asian, 0.8% from other races, and 2.4% from two or more races. Hispanic or Latino of any race were 3.0% of the population.

There were 3,843 households, of which 43.6% had children under the age of 18 living with them, 50.5% were married couples living together, 14.8% had a female householder with no husband present, 5.6% had a male householder with no wife present, and 29.0% were non-families. 24.4% of all households were made up of individuals, and 10.1% had someone living alone who was 65 years of age or older. The average household size was 2.67 and the average family size was 3.16.

The median age in the city was 32.2 years. 30.5% of residents were under the age of 18; 7.7% were between the ages of 18 and 24; 30.4% were from 25 to 44; 19.6% were from 45 to 64; and 11.8% were 65 years of age or older. The gender makeup of the city was 47.4% male and 52.6% female.

2000 census
As of the census of 2000, there were 6,737 people, 2,521 households, and 1,747 families living in the city. The racial makeup of the city was 93.87% White, 2.86% African American, 0.39% Native American, 0.13% Asian, 0.01% Pacific Islander, 0.80% from other races, and 1.93% from two or more races. Hispanic or Latino of any race were 1.71% of the population.

There were 2,521 households, out of which 39.8% had children under the age of 18 living with them, 51.6% were married couples living together, 14.6% had a female householder with no husband present, and 30.7% were non-families. 26.6% of all households were made up of individuals, and 12.5% had someone living alone who was 65 years of age or older. The average household size was 2.56 and the average family size was 3.10.

In the city, the population was spread out, with 29.8% under the age of 18, 9.2% from 18 to 24, 30.6% from 25 to 44, 16.4% from 45 to 64, and 14.0% who were 65 years of age or older. The median age was 32 years. For every 100 females, there were 87.1 males. For every 100 females age 18 and over, there were 83.7 males.

The median income for a household in the city was $40,332, and the median income for a family was $46,818. Males had a median income of $34,750 versus $24,440 for females. The per capita income for the city was $17,666. About 7.6% of families and 11.0% of the population were below the poverty line, including 13.4% of those under age 18 and 14.6% of those age 65 or over.

Education
Troy is home to Troy Buchanan High School, Troy Middle School, Troy South Middle School,
Main Street Elementary, Boone Elementary School, Claude Brown Elementary, Cuivre Park Elementary, Lincoln County R-III Early Childhood Education Center, William Cappel Elementary School, and Lincoln Elementary School, all of which are part of the Lincoln County R-III School District

Troy does not have a public library. The Powell Memorial Library, is owned and operated by the Troy R-III School District.

Notable people
 Frederick Gilmer Bonfils (1860–1933), publisher of the Denver Post
 Emily Crane (b. 1994) softball player
 Pendleton Dudley (1876-1966), journalist
 David Hungate (b. 1948), musician, bass player
 William L. Hungate (1922–2007), congressman and federal judge
 Richard Alonzo Jaccard (1918–1942), Navy ensign who was awarded the Navy Cross
 Wilson McCoy (1902–1961), illustrator and painter
 DeAnna Price (b. 1993) American record holder in track and field in the hammer throw.
 Harley Race (1943–2019), retired professional wrestler
 Ed Schieffer (b. 1949) politician
 Nathaniel Simonds (1775–1850), state treasurer of Missouri (1821–1829)
 Dennis Tankersley (b. 1979), baseball player
 May Bonfils Stanton (1883-1962) heiress and philanthropist
 Pat Elzie (b. 1960) basketball coach
 Richard Henry Norton (1849-1918) Politician
 Randy Pietzman (b. 1961) politician

References

External links

 
 Historic maps of Troy in the Sanborn Maps of Missouri Collection at the University of Missouri

Cities in Lincoln County, Missouri
Cities in Missouri
County seats in Missouri